Cyathea holdridgeana, synonym Cyathea albomarginata, is a species of tree fern native to Panamá and Costa Rica. It grows in wet forests at elevations of 2400–2800 m, considerably higher than most other tree ferns of Central America.

Cyathea holdridgeana is a small tree with a trunk up to 50 cm tall. Petiole purplish-brown with white margins, scaly but not spiny; scales (= modified appendages attached to the margins of the petioles) bicolored, dark purple in the center but white along the margins; dead scales appearing totally white. Leaves bipinnate; pinnulae 10–12 cm long

References

holdridgeana
Flora of Costa Rica
Flora of Panama